
This is a list of films that have been or are banned in Australia.

Rationale for banning 

Films that are banned in Australia have been considered to be offensive against the standards of morality, decency and propriety generally accepted by "reasonable adults" to the extent that they should not be classified.

Films can be banned by the Australian Classification Board if they "depict, express or otherwise deal with matters  of sex, drug misuse or addiction, crime, cruelty, violence or revolting or abhorrent phenomena in such a way that they offend against the standards of morality, decency and propriety generally accepted by reasonable adults to the extent that they should not be classified", "describe or depict in a way that is likely to cause offence to a reasonable adult, a person who is, or appears to be, a child under 18 (whether the person is engaged in sexual activity or not)", or "promote, incite or instruct in matters of crime or violence". Additionally, the RC classification is mandatory for any classifiable work that advocates the commission of a terrorist act under section 9A of the Classification Act of 1995.

Films that are banned by the Australian Classification Board are labelled "Refused Classification" (RC) and the sale, distribution, public exhibition and/or importation of RC material is a criminal offense punishable by a fine up to A$275,000 and/or up to 10 years imprisonment. Personal ownership of banned films is legal (except in Western Australia and parts of the Northern Territory and/or if they contain illegal content), and it is legal to access them via the internet. Such penalties do not apply to individuals, but rather individuals responsible for and/or corporations distributing or exhibiting such films to a wider audience.

Banned films

See also
List of banned films
Cinema of Australia
Film censorship
Bushranger ban

External links
refused-classification.com — site with a frequently updated and far more comprehensive list of films and other media refused classification

References

Censorship in Australia
Banned films
Australia

Australia
Banned